August Hirt (28 April 1898 – 2 June 1945) was an anatomist with Swiss and German nationality who served as a chairman at the Reich University in Strasbourg during World War II. He performed experiments with mustard gas on inmates at the Natzweiler-Struthof concentration camp and played a lead role in the murders of 86 people at Natzweiler-Struthof for the Jewish skull collection. The skeletons of his victims were meant to become specimens at the Institute of anatomy in Strasbourg, but completion of the project was stopped by the progress of the war. He was an SS-Hauptsturmführer (captain) and in 1944, an SS-Sturmbannführer (major).

World War I, post-war education and joining the Nazi party

Hirt was the son of a Swiss business man. In 1914, he volunteered, while still a high school student, to fight in World War I on the German side. In October 1916, he was wounded in the upper jaw by a bullet. He received the Iron Cross and returned to Mannheim in 1917. He studied medicine at Heidelberg University. In 1921, he gained German citizenship. In 1922, Hirt obtained his doctorate in medicine with "Der Grenzstrang des Sympathicus bei einigen Sauriern" (English: The Ganglions in the Sympathetic Nervous System of Some Lizards). He then worked at the Anatomical Institute in Heidelberg and in 1925 he was authorized to teach thanks to a thesis on nerve cells. In 1930 he became professor at Heidelberg University.

In September 1932, Hirt joined the Militant League for German Culture. On 1 April 1933, he joined the Schutzstaffel (SS-Nr. 100 414), and was promoted to Hauptsturmführer (captain) on 1 July 1937, but he was only a member of the Nazi Party from 1 May 1937, when he enrolled in the universities of the Reich (Mitgliedsnr. 4012784). From 1 March 1942, he was a member of the personal staff of the RuSHA, the organisation in charge of "racial and ideological purity" of the members of the SS. He attained the rank of Sturmbannführer (major) in 1944.

Hirt was married and had a son and a daughter.

World War II
From 1 April 1936 Hirt was associate director of the Institute of  anatomy at University of Greifswald. On 1 October 1938, he obtained the same post at Goethe University. At the beginning of the Second World War he was an SS medical chief (from August 1939 to April 1941). During this time the Battle of France took place, resulting in the fall of France and its occupation by German forces, and Hirt participated in the battle. He then became director of the new Institute of anatomy at the Reichsuniversität Straßburg.

Jewish skeleton collection
The Ahnenerbe under the Third Reich was a society that organised "medical experiments" on prisoners. Hirt conceived and directed one called the Jewish skeleton collection, which was begun but not completed as intended. He also performed experiments on cadavers and collected human skulls. He was appointed director since 1941 of the Institute of Anatomy in Strasbourg. He wanted to create a collection of skulls of "Judeo-Bolsheviks", as part of his research on race. According to him, the Jewish race was on the point of extinction and he wished to gather a collection of them while there was still time. Hirt sent his project to Heinrich Himmler. Hirt wrote of this project: "There are important collections of skulls of nearly all the races and peoples. Except for the Jews, of which science has so few skulls, so it is not possible to draw any meaningful inferences. The war in the East gives us the opportunity to fill the gap. We have the opportunity to acquire a tangible scientific document by procuring the skulls of Jewish-Bolsheviks who embody the disgusting but characteristic subhuman."

Hirt conceived the project to go beyond a collection of skulls, to a collection of Jewish skeletons and so presented his research plan to Himmler. He approved the project so that Hirt could begin his "medical experiments." Working with the Ahnenerbe division, Wolfram Sievers, Bruno Beger, Hans Fleischhacker and Hirt together collected people from among the Auschwitz inmates in order to create an anatomical specimen collection specifically of Jews. Hirt proposed to use the small-scale gas chamber at Natzweiler-Struthof to murder the people selected, keeping their corpses intact, and then have their corpses shipped immediately to the Anatomical Institute in Strasbourg for the casts and skeletons he wanted for this collection.

Hirt directed that 115 persons be selected for measurements: 79 Jewish men, 30 Jewish women, 2 Poles, and 4 "Asians". They were selected among the inmates in August 1943 at Auschwitz by his assistants, the anthropologists Bruno Beger and Hans Fleischhacker. The group was quarantined to protect them from a typhus epidemic in the camp. Measurements were taken of the selected inmates at Auschwitz. Of those initially selected, it is believed that 89 persons (60 men and 29 women) were sent to Natzweiler-Struthof. Three men died en route, leaving 86 people.

Natzweiler-Struthof camp
These 86 people were sent to Natzweiler-Struthof concentration camp on 30 July 1943. They were fed reasonably well to improve their appearance for the body casts. They were divided into four groups and successively gassed by Josef Kramer, on 11, 13, 17, and 19 August 1943. Their bodies were returned to Hirt at the anatomical laboratory of the Reich University in Strasbourg for preparation as an anthropological display, taking body casts and preparing the skeletons.

In September 1944, the rapid approach of the Allies led to the project being abandoned and Himmler ordered the destruction of all traces of this compromising collection. That order was not completed, nor had the casts been taken or the skeletons been prepared. The Allies found corpses and partial remains preserved in formalin for eighty-six bodies upon the liberation of Strasbourg. The corpses were buried 23 October 1945 in the municipal cemetery of Strasbourg-Robertsau before being transferred in 1951 to the Jewish cemetery of Strasbourg-Cronenbourg. The names of the victims were not known, and the purpose for their presence at the Anatomical Institute were not known. Some information was learned in post-war trials as to the project proposed by Hirt.

August Hirt fled Strasbourg in September 1944, hiding in Tübingen in southern Germany across the river from Alsace.

Death
Hirt committed suicide on 2 June 1945, aged 47, at Schluchsee, Baden-Württemberg, in the Black Forest. His suicide was not known when he was tried in absentia at the Military War Crimes Trial at Metz on 23 December 1953 for his war crimes. His death was finally confirmed in the mid-1960s when the Israeli secret service had his body exhumed, and an Israeli pathologist conclusively identified the bones.

Some records prepared for his trial are in possession of the US National Archives, including the list of identification numbers tattooed on the prisoners at Auschwitz and "Photocopies of certificates of proof of ancestry, in connection with research on prisoners in the Konzentrationslager Natzweiler, ...Feb. 9-Nov. 3, 1942. Partial copies of slips for the admittance of prisoners into the Konzentrationslager Natzweiler, medical examinations on prisoners, and a death certificate, Dec. 9, 1942-Aug. 9, 1944. Feb. 9, 1942-Aug. 9, 1944".

Posthumous
In the book, Die Namen der Nummern (The Names of the Numbers, 2004), Hans-Joachim Lang describes this mass murder. He also recounts how he was able to determine the identities of 86 victims, 60 years after they were murdered. In November 2005, the remains of some of these victims were buried in the Jewish cemetery of Cronenbourg on the outskirts of Strasbourg, in the same area where bodies of other victims were buried in 1951, names unknown. On 11 December 2005, a memorial engraved with the names of the 86 victims was placed there. In addition, a memorial plaque honoring the victims was placed outside the Anatomy Institute at Strasbourg's University Hospital. In 2015, a researcher, Raphael Toledano, identified tissue samples of victims in test tubes and a jar in the Strasbourg Medical Institute's closed collection. This followed his discovery of a 1952 letter from the then-director of the Institute, Camille Simonin, about the experiments directed by Hirt. On 6 September 2015, these remains were buried in the Cronenbourg Cemetery.

See also
Block 10
Anton Dilger
Eduard Pernkopf
Hermann Stieve

References

Further reading

Documentary film

External links

Auschwitz-Birkenau Memorial and Museum
Die Namen der Nummern – The Names of the Numbers: The Courses of 86 Lives 
Holocaust History.org 

1898 births
Politicians from Mannheim
Physicians from Mannheim
People from the Grand Duchy of Baden
Academic staff of Heidelberg University
Academic staff of the University of Greifswald
Academic staff of Goethe University Frankfurt
Nazi Party politicians
Militant League for German Culture members
SS-Hauptsturmführer
Nazi human subject research
Nazis who committed suicide in Germany
Suicides by firearm in Germany
People indicted for war crimes
Waffen-SS personnel
Recipients of the Iron Cross (1914)
1945 suicides
Natzweiler-Struthof concentration camp personnel
Holocaust perpetrators in France
German Army personnel of World War I